The River Mersey is in North West England. Its name derives from Old English and means "boundary river", possibly referring to its having been a border between the ancient kingdoms of Mercia and Northumbria. For centuries it has formed part of the boundary between the historic counties of Lancashire and Cheshire.

The Mersey starts at the confluence of the River Tame and River Goyt in Stockport. It flows westwards through south Manchester, then into the Manchester Ship Canal at Irlam, becoming a part of the canal and maintaining its water levels. After  it exits the canal, flowing towards Warrington where it widens. It then narrows as it passes between Runcorn and Widnes. The course of the river then turns northwards as the estuary narrows between Liverpool and Birkenhead on the Wirral Peninsula to the west, and empties into Liverpool Bay. In total the river flows .

A railway tunnel between Birkenhead and Liverpool as part of the Mersey Railway opened in 1886. Two road tunnels pass under the estuary from Liverpool: the Queensway Tunnel opened in 1934 connecting the city to Birkenhead, and the Kingsway Tunnel, opened in 1971, to Wallasey. A road bridge, completed in 1961 and later named the Silver Jubilee Bridge, crosses between Runcorn and Widnes, adjacent to the Runcorn Railway Bridge which opened in 1868. A second road bridge, the Mersey Gateway, opened in October 2017, carrying a six-lane road connecting Runcorn's Central Expressway with Speke Road and Queensway in Widnes. The Mersey Ferry operates between Pier Head in Liverpool and Woodside in Birkenhead and Seacombe, and has become a tourist attraction offering cruises that provide an overview of the river and surrounding areas.

Water quality in the Mersey was severely affected by industrialisation, and in 1985, the Mersey Basin Campaign was established to improve water quality and encourage waterside regeneration. In 2009 it was announced that the river is "cleaner than at any time since the industrial revolution" and is "now considered one of the cleanest in the UK". The Mersey Valley Countryside Warden Service manages local nature reserves such as Chorlton Ees and Sale Water Park.

The river gave its name to Merseybeat, developed by bands from Liverpool, notably the Beatles. In 1965 it was the subject of the top-ten hit single "Ferry Cross the Mersey" by Gerry and the Pacemakers.

Etymology
The Mersey was possibly the 'border river' between Mercia and Northumbria.

Course
The Mersey is formed from three tributaries: the River Etherow, the River Goyt and the River Tame. The modern accepted start of the Mersey is at the confluence of the Tame and Goyt, in central Stockport, Greater Manchester. However, older definitions, and many older maps, place its start a few miles up the Goyt at Compstall; for example the 1911 Encyclopædia Britannica states "It is formed by the junction of the Goyt and the Etherow a short distance below Marple in Cheshire on the first-named stream." The 1784 John Stockdale map shows the River Mersey extending to Mottram, and forming the boundary between Cheshire and Derbyshire. In the west of Stockport it flows at the base of a cliff below the road called Brinksway before reaching flat country. An early Ordnance Survey map indicates the spring at Red Hole on the Lancashire/Yorkshire boundary at the head of one of the Etherow's longest headwaters, as being the Source of the River Mersey.

Stockport to Warrington

From Central Stockport the river flows through or past Heaton Mersey, Didsbury, Northenden, Chorlton-cum-Hardy, Stretford, Sale, Ashton on Mersey, Urmston and Flixton, then at Irlam flows into the Manchester Ship Canal, which is the canalised section of the River Irwell at this point. The old course of the Mersey has been obliterated by the canal past Hollins Green to Rixton although the old river bed can be seen outside Irlam and at Warburton. At Rixton the River Bollin enters the canal from the south and the Mersey leaves the canal to the north, meandering through Woolston, where the ship canal company's dredgings have formed the Woolston Eyes nature reserve, and on to Warrington. The river is tidal from Howley Weir in Warrington, although high spring tides often top the weir. Before construction of the ship canal, work to improve navigation included Woolston New Cut, bypassing a meander, and Howley Lock for craft to avoid the weir; the new cut and lock are still evident. The island formed between the weir and the lock is known locally as "Monkey Island".

Runcorn Gap

West of Warrington the river widens, and then narrows as it passes through the Runcorn Gap between the towns of Runcorn and Widnes, in Halton. The Manchester Ship Canal passes through the gap to the south of the river.  The gap is bridged by the Silver Jubilee Bridge and Runcorn Railway Bridge. Another crossing, the Mersey Gateway road bridge opened in October 2017, and is situated about 1 mile upstream from the Runcorn Gap where the river is considerably wider.

Estuary
The course of the river then heads north, with Liverpool to the east and the Wirral Peninsula to the west. The Manchester Ship Canal enters the river at Eastham Locks. The eastern part of the estuary is much affected by silting, and part of it is marked on modern maps as dry land rather than tidal. The wetlands are of importance to wildlife, and are listed as a Ramsar site.

Most of the conurbation on both sides of the estuary is known as Merseyside. American author Herman Melville described Liverpool Docks as being comparable to the pyramids in the vast scale of their construction. The docks were built out into the river bed. The Mersey Docks and Harbour Board used granite from a quarry it owned in Scotland for construction of the quays. Birkenhead grew quickly in the 19th century following the introduction of steamships, the earliest being the wooden paddle steamer Elizabeth in 1815. Docks were developed along with a shipbuilding industry, flour milling and soap manufacture on the river's Cheshire bank.

Seaforth Dock, a freeport on the Liverpool side of the estuary where it meets Liverpool Bay, opened in 1971. The dock deals with around 500,000 containers, over 1.2 million tonnes of oil, over 2.5 million tonnes of grain and animal feed, 452,000 tonnes of wood per year. About 25% of all container traffic between the UK and USA passes through the port making it one of the most successful in the world and known as the "Atlantic Gateway". Liverpool was the first UK port with radar assisted operations.

From  neap tide to  spring tide, the River Mersey has the second highest tidal range in Britain – second only to the River Severn. The narrows in the river estuary between Dingle Point on the Liverpool banks to New Brighton on the Wirral, forces water to flow faster creating a deep channel along the section of river.

For 200 years an admiral was appointed as a conservator to ensure the river remained navigable. Mary Kendrick was the first woman to the post and she had spent years studying a Mersey barrage in the 1980s. 

Taylor's Bank is a large sandbank extending out to sea on the north side of the channel entrance to the river on which many ships have come to grief over the years.

River crossings

Historically the lowest bridging point on the Mersey was at Warrington where there has been a bridge since medieval times. The first ferry across the estuary was introduced in medieval times by monks from Birkenhead Priory. They transported travellers or accommodated them at the priory in bad weather.

Countless people died on the River Mersey until the advent of safe passage via bridges and tunnels. Many of these deaths were of people who earned their living on the river, either as mariners or dock workers. The majority of mariners to die worked on the Mersey flat boats and drowned due to the weather conditions or poor craft maintenance, although many ordinary civilians perished too. Another ferry existed at Runcorn Gap and by today's safety standards was highly dangerous. Passengers had to traverse wooden planks over the mud flats to reach the ferry boats which themselves were often poorly maintained and leaking. Even the steps down to the river bank were described as "beautifully slippery". In the dark the ferry was particularly worrying as there were few or no lights and the journey was only undertaken on a "needs must" basis. Complaints about the appalling conditions were reported in the local and national press consistently for over 40 years.

In the early 19th century steam operated ferries were introduced. The Mersey Ferry, managed and operated by Merseytravel, operates between Pier Head in Liverpool and Woodside in Birkenhead and Seacombe. It has become a tourist attraction offering cruises that provide an overview of the river and surrounding areas.

The Mersey Railway completed its tunnel through the estuary's underlying Triassic sandstone using manual labour in 1885. Intended as a pneumatic railway, the company opted for steam trains from its opening until it was electrified in 1903. The railway is now part of the Merseyrail network. Two road tunnels pass under the estuary from Liverpool. By road, the Queensway Tunnel opened in 1934 connecting the city to Birkenhead, and the Kingsway Tunnel, opened in 1971, connects with Wallasey.

Further upstream, the Runcorn Railway Bridge over the river at Runcorn Gap was built in the 1860s for the London and North Western Railway on the mainline between London and Liverpool. It had a cantilevered footway providing an alternative crossing to a ferry. In 1905 the now demolished Widnes-Runcorn Transporter Bridge opened and took cars and passengers via a cable car. The Silver Jubilee Bridge, completed in 1961, is immediately adjacent.

East of Warrington, the M6 motorway crosses the river and the Manchester Ship Canal on the Thelwall Viaduct. When the viaduct opened in 1963, it was the longest motorway bridge in England. A second viaduct alongside opened in 1995; northbound traffic uses the old viaduct and southbound the new.

A new 6-lane bridge, the "Mersey Gateway", between Runcorn and Widnes began its construction phase in May 2014 and opened just after midnight on 14 October 2017. At the same time the Silver Jubilee Bridge was closed to undergo maintenance for approximately 6–12 months, but will remain open to pedestrians and cyclists. The new bridge uses tolls and the existing Silver Jubilee Bridge will also be tolled.

Environment
Water quality in the Mersey was severely affected by industrialisation, and in 1985, the Mersey Basin Campaign was established to improve water quality and encourage waterside regeneration. In 2002, oxygen levels that could support fish along the entire length were recorded for the first time since industry began on the Mersey.

In 2009 it was announced that the river is "cleaner than at any time since the industrial revolution" and is "now considered one of the cleanest [rivers] in the UK".

Sediment pollution
Persistent organic and mercury (Hg) pollution contained within sediments of the Mersey estuary have been evaluated by British Geological Survey. Mersey river sediments from outer to inner estuary (Alfred Dock to Widnes) contain a variety of common organic pollutants, including polyaromatic hydrocarbons (PAH) with concentrations which fall in the middle of the range of similarly industrial-urban river-estuaries. The distribution of individual PAH compounds suggests that the Mersey has contaminants mainly derived from combustion sources such as vehicle exhaust as well as coal burning. The distribution of the toxic heavy metal Mercury (Hg) has been assessed by measuring 203 sediments taken from shallow cores (0.4  – 1.6 m) extracted from both the main river and adjacent salt marshes. The average amount of Hg in the Mersey was found to be 2 mg/kg with the highest amounts of 5 mg/kg occurring below the surface at concentrations harmful to sediment dwelling biota. The vertical rise and fall in Hg pollution observed at four Mersey salt marshes indicated a decline in metal pollution since the 1980s.

Fauna
Salmon have returned to the river and have been seen jumping at Woolston and Howley Weirs between September and November. Salmon parr and smolt have been caught in the Mersey's tributaries, the River Goyt and the River Bollin. Atlantic grey seals from Liverpool Bay occasionally venture into the estuary along with bottlenose dolphin and harbour porpoise. Otter tracks have been observed near Fiddlers Ferry. Other fish in the estuary include cod, whiting, dab, plaice and flounder. Spiny dogfish, mackerel and tope feed on shrimp and whitebait in the estuary. For ducks, the estuary is important to common shelducks and Eurasian teal. Waders include redshank, black-tailed godwit, dunlin, pintail and turnstone.

Environmental designations
The section of the estuary between Runcorn Railway Bridge and Bromborough, including Hale Duck Decoy and Mount Manisty, is designated as a Site of Special Scientific Interest, the SSSI citation describing it as an "internationally important site for wildfowl". There are further SSSIs at New Ferry and Mersey Narrows. The Mersey Estuary, and the Mersey Narrows and North Wirral Foreshore, are also Ramsar sites.

Navigation
 
Capt. William Gill of the Isle of Man Steam Packet Company, charted a safe, navigable channel (the Victoria Channel) through the treacherous uncharted waters of the estuary in 1836.

Since the construction of the Manchester Ship Canal, large commercial vessels do not usually navigate the estuary beyond Garston on the north bank, or the locks into the ship canal at Eastham. Deep-water channels are maintained to both. Until the early 20th century, commercial traffic bound for further upstream carried cargo in large flat-bottomed sailing barges known as Mersey Flats to Howley Wharf in Warrington and (via the Sankey Canal) to St Helens. Motor barges delivered to riverside factories at Warrington until at least the 1970s, but nowadays only pleasure craft and yachts use the upper estuary and the tidal river where a number of sailing clubs are based. Although river craft can continue upstream to Howley Weir, there are no landing or mooring facilities. Before construction of the ship canal, a lock bypassing Howley Weir allowed navigation further upstream via a straight "cut" avoiding a meander around Woolston.

Recreation
The Mersey Valley Countryside Warden Service manages local nature reserves such as Chorlton Ees and Sale Water Park recreational sites and provides an educational service along the Mersey from Manchester to the Manchester Ship Canal.

It is possible to canoe on parts of the river between Stockport and Carrington. Liverpool Sailing Club located at Garston Coastal Park on the north bank of the estuary has a 1000 feet slipway giving access to river for water sports.

The wooded suburban stretch of the river from above Howley Weir to Woolston is also used for recreational and competitive rowing, operated from the Warrington Rowing Club.

Angling has become popular on some stretches of the river as fish such as perch, barbel, grayling, carp, roach, chub, trout, pike, bream and dace have been caught.
Warrington Anglers Association have fishing rights on a large stretch of the River through most of Warrington. Prince Albert Angling Society also have a small stretch near Rixton.

The river has also faced problems regarding the poaching of fish despite a strict 'catch and release' policy imposed on anglers for ecological reasons which applies to most UK waterways.

Mersey barrage
Proposals continue for the construction of the Mersey Barrage, a tidal scheme to generate electricity and create another crossing of the river. Very high spring tides can generate a tidal bore from Hale as far upstream as Warrington. On 7 December 2022, the Liverpool City Region mayor announced cooperation between the City Region and K-water of South Korea, who built and operates the Sihwa Lake Tidal Power Station, in order to construct a similar operation on the River Mersey.

In popular culture
The river gave its name to Merseybeat, developed by bands from Liverpool, notably the Beatles. In 1965 it was the subject of the top-ten hit single "Ferry Cross the Mersey" by Gerry and the Pacemakers, and a musical film of the same name. The Liverpool poets published an anthology of their work, The Mersey Sound, in 1967.

The river's stretch through Manchester is the main theme in the Stone Roses song "Mersey Paradise", included on the B-side of the 12" version of their 1989 hit "She Bangs the Drums", and on their 1992 compilation album Turns into Stone.

The Tall ships' fleet has visited the Mersey on four occasions, first in 1984, then in 1992, 2008 and 2012.

The traditional song “Leaving of Liverpool” mentions the river in its opening line.

Religious significance
The Mersey is considered sacred by British Hindus, and worshipped in a similar way to the River Ganges. Festival of Immersion ceremonies are held annually on the river, in which clay figures representing the Hindu Lord Ganesha, the elephant deity riding a mouse, are submerged in the river from a ferry boat. Followers throw flowers, pictures and coins into the river.

Tributaries

From its lowest point, moving upstream, confluences and tributaries of the Mersey catchment include:

 The Birket
 River Fender
 Prenton Brook
 Arrowe Brook
 Greasby Brook
 Newton Brook
 River Dibbin
 Clatter Brook
 River Gowy
  Hornsmill Brook
 River Weaver
River Dane
River Wheelock
River Croco
  Ram's Brook
 Bowers Brook
 Sankey Brook
 Padgate Brook
 Morris Brook
 Spittle Brook
 Thelwall Brook
 Fishington Brook
 River Bollin
River Dean
 Marsh Brook
 Red Brook
 Glaze Brook/River Glaze
 River Irwell
River Medlock
River Roch
River Beal
River Spodden
River Irk
River Croal
 Old Eea Brook
 Stromford Brook
 Chorlton Brook
 Barrow Brook
 Gatley Brook
 Micker Brook
 Tin Brook
 River Tame
 River Goyt
River Etherow
River Sett
River Kinder

References

Further reading

External links

 River Mersey Information
 Howley Lock
 "Salmon behaviour in the Mersey Catchment" at environment-agency.gov.uk
 
 Thorp, Robert. Mersey Built: The Role of Merseyside in the American Civil War. Wilmington: Vernon Press, 2017.

 
Estuaries of England
Rivers of Cheshire
Rivers of Greater Manchester
Rivers of Merseyside
River navigations in the United Kingdom
Rivers of the Metropolitan Borough of Stockport
Rivers of Trafford
Ramsar sites in England